The Dead and the Gone is a young adult science fiction dystopian novel by Susan Beth Pfeffer. Released in hardcover in May 2008, it is the second book in The Last Survivors, following Life as We Knew It and preceding This World We Live In and The Shade of the Moon.

Background
Pfeffer's novel Life As We Knew It was created after watching the original film Meteor (1979), noting that "it got [her] thinking about how the people who have the most to lose if the world comes to an end are kids," and wanted to see how her characters would cope with a situation that was out of their control. The Dead and the Gone occurs at the same time as the first novel, Life As We Knew It, but in New York City. She playfully mentioned that "I figure with 300 million people alive in the United States, even if I write about 10 people a book, I can still get another 2,999,998 novels out of that meteor, and that should keep me busy and entertained well past the foreseeable future."

The Dead and the Gone uses a third-person narrative, while the previous book, Life As We Knew It, used a first-person narrative in a journal format. Asked about the change in narrative, Pfeffer replied quite simply that in her planning processes, she "just could not envision a teenage boy keeping a diary. It's as simple as that," accounting for the change.

Plot
Alex Morales is a seventeen-year-old Puerto Rican-American boy living in New York City with his parents and younger sisters, Briana and Julie. He also has an older brother, Carlos, who is serving in the Marines. While their father is in Puerto Rico for their grandmother’s funeral, a large asteroid crashes into the moon and knocks it closer to the Earth (as seen in Life As We Knew It). Alex’s mother, a nurse, is summoned to the hospital to help, leaving Alex to watch over Bri and Julie. The next morning, Alex’s Uncle Jimmy visits and helps them stock food in each other’s apartments, and when they get home Bri says she received a static-filled call from someone she believes was their father. Alex also receives a call from Carlos reassuring him that he is alright and will soon be deployed. Later that day, a massive storm strikes the city and floods the subways, causing Alex to worry since he knows his mother takes the subway to and from work in addition to his father being in Puerto Rico when a hurricane strikes. On Sunday, telephone service resumes and Alex calls the hospital his mother works out but is unable to receive word about her wellbeing. That Tuesday, Alex’s all-boys Catholic high school resumes and he meets Father Francis Mulrooney, a stoic retired priest asked to act as temporary headmaster for the school. Later that week, Alex visits Yankee Stadium where the bodies of the dead are laid out for identification, but does not find anyone he recognizes. Tensions rise in the Morales household as Bri and Julie grow frustrated with the lack of information and Alex admits that they shouldn’t expect to see their parents ever again.

Alex takes up an opportunity to send Briana to live at an upstate convent indefinitely, where she will be fed and cared for alongside other Catholic girls, leaving Alex and Julie alone in the apartment. Jimmy and his wife Lorraine leave the city with their children to move to Tulsa and offer to take Julie, but Alex refuses, having promised Bri that when she returned their family would not disappear. Around this time, some of their neighbors also leave the city and leave Alex the keys to their apartment for his family’s use. Alex and Julie raid several other abandoned apartments in their building, replenishing their food supply. In June, Alex and Julie’s schools announce that they will remain open through the summer and provide lunches. The city begins mandatory evacuations in several parts of the city as a new food distribution program is announced. Alex and Julie stand in line for distribution, but they run out before they reach the front and a riot breaks out, which they narrowly escape. The next week Alex arrives in line without Julie as soon as curfew lifts and is able to get a bag of food. At school, his friend Kevin offers to begin standing in line with him so Alex’s family can have an extra bag.

As the summer goes on, volcanic eruptions caused by the moon occur worldwide and gases begin to block out the sun, causing the temperature to begin dropping dramatically. Alex receives a postcard from Carlos, saying he has been deployed to Texas. Despite finding the process grotesque, Alex and Kevin begin engaging in “body shopping”; that is, looting abandoned corpses and selling the goods for food and supplies.

In September, Briana returns from the convent, having developed asthma from the poor air quality. Feeling guilty for everything he’s done to feed his sisters and his growing distance from God, Alex approaches Father Mulrooney to confess his sins. Mulrooney assures his desire to keep his family alive is righteous and advises him to thank God for everything he has while there is so much suffering in the world, and also to do something to make his sisters happy. Inspired, Alex throws Julie a surprise party for her thirteenth birthday.

One of Alex's schoolmates with asthma warns him that his basement apartment is bad for Bri’s health. In response, Alex moves the family to an abandoned upstairs apartment. In October, Julie’s girls-only school closes and the students begin attending Alex’s high school. The population of the combined school continues to dwindle as more students die or move away. Among their possessions, Julie finds a winning lottery ticket for ten thousand dollars, but Harvey, Alex’s supplies dealer, tells them money is obsolete and that the only meaningful currency is food and other essentials. A frustrated Julie storms out of the store and Alex later finds a man trying to carry her off, but he throws a can at the man’s head and Julie escapes.

In November, Harvey tells Alex that he is able to arrange for him and Bri to leave the city for someplace better, but he must trade Julie away to an anonymous man. Alex refuses. Desperate, he visits Robert Flynn, the father of a wealthy former schoolmate, and asks for help moving his sisters somewhere safe. Flynn warns him that the city will only last as long as full evacuation takes and grants him three passes to an unspecified safe location, which Alex hides from his sisters until the day comes for them to leave. One day in December while he and Alex are looting bodies, Kevin is struck by a snow-covered tree branch and dies immediately.

The day arrives to leave and the Morales family makes their way to the designated convoy, but are informed that exit has been canceled because of an imposed city-wide quarantine because of the flu, but the current plan is for buses to leave every two weeks. While waiting for the next convoy date, Alex goes to Harvey’s store and finds that he has died, leaving behind enough food to last until after Christmas.

Alex becomes sick with the flu and his sisters struggle to care for him. He hallucinates vividly of his parents, Kevin, Harvey, Father Mulrooney, and Carlos, but recovers on his birthday. The day after he realizes Briana has disappeared from the apartment and Julie doesn’t know where she is and Alex insists on getting up to look for her, but to no avail. Two days after Christmas, electricity temporarily returns and Alex and Julie find Bri dead in the elevator, the electricity having gone out while she was using it.

The next day, Alex returns to his school to light a candle for Bri. He meets with Father Mulrooney and one of the nuns, Sister Rita, and confesses his feelings of guilt over Bri’s death. Mulrooney says Sister Rita is leaving New York for a religious college in Georgia and that he can help Alex and Julie leave with her. The next day, the siblings leave behind the apartment for good, hopeful of their future.

Characters

Alex Morales: A 17-year-old Puerto Rican boy who has to take care of his two younger sisters after the moon disaster occurs. He blames himself for all of the things happening to his sisters and his supposed inability to help them. He attends a private school on a scholarship, and before the moon disaster worked at a pizza place. Near the end of the book, he gets the flu.

Briana Morales (Bri): Alex's devoutly religious 14-year-old sister. She is more used to cooking and cleaning than Alex is, and takes on these household chores. Alex arranges for her to be sent to a convent in the country, where she can receive education and regular meals. She is brought back to New York some time later, having developed asthma due to the volcanic ash polluting the air. After this, Alex won't let her do anything around the house, so it is left up to Julie. Because of her religious beliefs, she has faith that their parents are still alive and will return to the family eventually.

Julie Morales: Alex's youngest sister. Julie is 12 years old and turns 13 later in the book. She stays with Alex when Bri leaves, and despite their differences before the book, they become much closer as they struggle to survive. She gets on well with Bri despite their different religious attitudes, and is particularly close to Carlos. Despite Alex initially considering her to be a spoiled brat, she ultimately copes well with the situation they are in.

Father Mulrooney: The strict and uptight elderly head of Alex's private school. After Alex initially considered him to be unduly harsh, they become closer over time, with Father Mulrooney helping Alex and Julie escape what is left of the city at the end of the story.

Sister Rita: Headmaster of Julie and Bri's school, Holy Angels. Assisted Father Mulrooney help get Alex and Julie out of New York City.

Isabella Morales (Mami): Alex, Bri, and Julie's mother. A kind, nurturing, and caring woman who works as a nurse, Isabella is an effectual mother. She was most likely in the subways when the floods hit and is presumed dead.

Luis Morales (Papi): Alex's father, who, while strict and overly-uptight, is still loving and nurturing. He was the superintendent of their apartment building, and the family lives in the basement apartment. He was on the coast of Puerto Rico when tides rose and is presumed dead.

Kevin Daley: A classmate of Alex's, who has black market connections. He teaches Alex how to "body shop" (taking the valuable items off of the people who die in the streets), and how to trade those items for food.

Harvey: A man with whom Alex trades items, from body shopping and from other apartments, for food. Introduced to him by Kevin Daley.

Carlos Morales: Alex's 22-year-old brother, who is in the Marines and deployed to Texas.

Chris Flynn: A wealthy boy in Alex's class. He was rivals with Alex before the apocalypse, and offers Alex a favour when he leaves the city.

Uncle Jimmy and Aunt Lorraine: Alex's aunt and uncle, who have three young children with another one on the way. They own a bodega, and Uncle Jimmy allows Alex and Julie to pack up some food to take home. They leave New York City to move to Tulsa, and offer to take Bri with them.

Father Franco: The priest at Alex's church. He organises for Bri to live at the convent, and provides solace and information throughout the disaster.

Tony Loretto and James Flaherty: Alex's schoolmates, who help Alex and Kevin plan a birthday party for Julie and get Bri asthma medication.

Reception
Publishers Weekly described The Dead and the Gone as "riveting", and said that "once again Pfeffer creates tension not only through her protagonist's day-to-day struggles but also through chilling moral dilemmas: whether to rob the dead, whom to save during a food riot, how long to preserve the hope that his parents might return," adding that "[t]he powerful images and wrenching tragedies will haunt readers." John Green of the New York Times said that it "transcend[s] [its] premises with terrifyingly well-imagined futures and superb characterization," and that "the story’s climax and resolution feel achingly right."

References

2008 American novels
2008 science fiction novels
American science fiction novels
American young adult novels
American post-apocalyptic novels
Novels set on the Moon
Climate change novels
Novels about impact events
Novels set in New York City
Debut science fiction novels
2008 debut novels